AA UTAD Rugby is a rugby team based in Vila Real, Portugal. As of the 2012/13 season, they play in the Second Division of the Campeonato Nacional de Rugby (National Championship). The club is the official rugby team of the University of Trás-os-Montes and Alto Douro.

History
The club was founded in 1984. They played their first match on 14 October of that year, winning 18–3 against GD Moitense (now Moita Rugby Clube da Bairrada).

Honours
Campeonato Nacional de Rugby II Divisão
1998, 2001

References

External links
AA UTAD Rugby

Portuguese rugby union teams
Rugby clubs established in 1984
Sport in Vila Real